Cervidae is a family of hoofed ruminant mammals in the order Artiodactyla. A member of this family is called a deer or a cervid. They are widespread throughout North and South America, Europe, and Asia, and are found in a wide variety of biomes. Most species do not have population estimates, though the roe deer has a population size of approximately 15 million, while several are considered endangered or critically endangered with populations as low as 200. One species, Père David's deer, is extinct in the wild, and one, Schomburgk's deer, went extinct in 1938.

The fifty-five species of Cervidae are split into nineteen genera within two subfamilies: Capreolinae (New World deer) and  Cervinae (Old World deer). Extinct species have also been placed into Capreolinae and Cervinae. More than one hundred extinct Cervidae species have been discovered, though due to ongoing research and discoveries the exact number and categorization is not fixed.

Conventions

Conservation status codes listed follow the International Union for Conservation of Nature (IUCN) Red List of Threatened Species. Range maps are provided wherever possible; if a range map is not available, a description of the cervid's range is provided. Ranges are based on the IUCN Red List for that species unless otherwise noted. All extinct species or subspecies listed alongside extant species went extinct after 1500 CE, and are indicated by a dagger symbol "".

Classification
The family Cervidae consists of 55 extant species belonging to 19 genera in 2 subfamilies and divided into dozens of extant subspecies. This does not include hybrid species or extinct prehistoric species. Additionally, one species, Schomburgk's deer, went extinct in 1938. The classification is based on the molecular phylogeny.

 Subfamily Capreolinae (New World deer)
Tribe Alceini
 Genus Alces: one species
Tribe Capreolini
 Genus Capreolus: two species
 Genus Hydropotes: one species
 Tribe Odocoileini
 Genus Blastocerus: one species
 Genus Hippocamelus: two species
 Genus Mazama: nine species
 Genus Odocoileus: three species
 Genus Ozotoceros: one species
 Genus Pudu: two species
 Genus Rangifer: one species
 Subfamily Cervinae (Old World deer)
 Tribe Muntiacini
 Genus Elaphodus: one species
 Genus Muntiacus: twelve species
 Tribe Cervini
 Genus Axis: four species
 Genus Cervus: five species
 Genus Dama: two species
 Genus Elaphurus: one species
 Genus Panolia: one species
 Genus Rucervus: two species (one extinct)
 Genus Rusa: four species

Cervids
The following classification is based on the taxonomy described by Mammal Species of the World (2005), with augmentation by generally accepted proposals made since using molecular phylogenetic analysis. This includes merging the two moose species of Alces into one, splitting out the monotypic Panolia genus from Rucervus, combining the monotypic subfamily Hydropotinae with Capreolinae. There are several additional proposals which are disputed, such as addition of the fair brocket to the Mazama genus, which are not included here.

Subfamily Capreolinae

Tribe Alceini

Tribe Capreolini

Tribe Odocoileini

Subfamily Cervinae

Tribe Muntiacini

Tribe Cervini

See also

 Largest cervids

References

Sources

 
 
 
 
 
 
 
 
 
 
 
 

.
cervidae
cervidae